Bela Baramad Khel is located on the Kabul River in Peshawar District, Pakistan. It is largely inhabited by Pashtuns. Around the 17th or 18th century, they came from the Afghan province of Nangarhar.

Populated places in Peshawar District